Sergeant Charles Ernest Garforth VC (23 October 1891 – 1 July 1973) was a British Army soldier and an English recipient of the Victoria Cross (VC), the highest and most prestigious award for gallantry in the face of the enemy that can be awarded to British and Commonwealth forces.

Garforth was 22 years old, and a corporal in the 15th (The King's) Hussars, British Army during the First World War when the following deeds took place for which he was awarded the VC.

On 23 August 1914 at Harmingnies, Belgium, Corporal Garforth volunteered to cut wire under fire, which enabled his squadron to escape. On 2 September when under constant fire in Dammartin, France, he extricated a sergeant who was lying under his dead horse, and carried him to safety. The next day, when another sergeant had lost his horse in a similar way, Corporal Garforth drew off the enemy fire and enabled the sergeant to get away.

He was taken prisoner in October 1914 and was repatriated in November 1918. He later achieved the rank of sergeant. His VC and other medals are displayed at the Imperial War Museum, London.

Upon his death, Garforth was cremated, and no monument or headstone was laid, as he technically had no grave. This was rectified on 30 August 2008, when a headstone was dedicated to him at Wilford Hill Cemetery in Nottingham, where his ashes were originally scattered.

References

Monuments to Courage (David Harvey, 1999)
The Register of the Victoria Cross (This England, 1997)

1891 births
1973 deaths
Burials in Nottinghamshire
People from Willesden
15th The King's Hussars soldiers
British World War I recipients of the Victoria Cross
British Army personnel of World War I
British World War I prisoners of war
World War I prisoners of war held by Germany
British Army recipients of the Victoria Cross
Military personnel from London